Sampan Kesi (born 3 July 1999) is a Thai professional footballer who plays as a left back, he has also been used as a wing back for Thai League 1 club Chonburi.

Honours

International
Thailand U-23
 2019 AFF U-22 Youth Championship: Runner up

External links
 

1999 births
Living people
Sampan Kesi
Sampan Kesi
Sampan Kesi
Association football defenders
Sampan Kesi
Sampan Kesi
Sampan Kesi
Sampan Kesi